Chernov's skink (Ablepharus chernovi) is a species of skink, a lizard in the family Scincidae. The species is endemic to northern Eurasia.

Geographic range
A. chernovi is native to Armenia, eastern Turkey, northern Syria, and the valleys of the Arax River and the Hrazdan River in the Caucasus.

Conservation status
A. chernovi was included in Red Data Book of the USSR in 1984, and in that of Armenia three years later.

Etymology
The specific name, chernovi, is in honour of Russian herpetologist Sergius Alexandrovich Chernov.

Subspecies
Four subspecies of Ablepharus chernovi are recognized as being valid, including the nominotypical subspecies.
Ablepharus chernovi chernovi 
Ablepharus chernovi eiselti 
Ablepharus chernovi isauriensis 
Ablepharus chernovi ressli

Habitat

Reproduction
A. chernovi is oviparous. An adult female may lay a clutch of up to four eggs in June.

References

Further reading
Darevsky IS (1953). "[Ablepharus chernovi sp. nov. (Reptilia, Sauria) from the Armenian Soviet Socialist Republic]". [Bulletin of the Society of Naturalists, Moscow] 58 (2): 39–41. (Ablepharus chernovi, new species). (in Russian).
Schmidtler JF (1997). "Die Ablepharus kitaibelii - Gruppe in Süd-Anatolien und benachbarten Gebeiten (Squamata: Sauria: Scincidae)". Herpetozoa 10 (1/2): 35–62. (Ablepharus chernovi eiselti, new subspecies, pp. 44–47; A. c. isauriensis, n. ssp., pp. 50–52; A. c. ressli, n. ssp., pp. 47–50). (in German, with an abstract in English).
Sindaco R, Jeremčenko VK (2008). The Reptiles of the Western Palearctic. 1. Annotated Checklist and Distributional Atlas of the Turtles, Crocodiles, Amphisbaenians and Lizards of Europe, North Africa, Middle East and Central Asia. (Monographs of the Societas Herpetologica Italica). Latina, Italy: Edizioni Belvedere.580 pp. .

Ablepharus
Reptiles described in 1953
Lizards of Asia
Taxa named by Ilya Darevsky